The 2014–15 Duquesne Dukes men's basketball team represented Duquesne University during the 2014–15 NCAA Division I men's basketball season. The Dukes, led by third year head coach Jim Ferry, played their home games at the A. J. Palumbo Center and were members of the Atlantic 10 Conference. They finish the season 12–19, 6–12 in A-10 play to finish in eleventh place. They advanced to the second round of the A-10 tournament where they lost to George Washington.

Previous season 
The 2013–14 Duquesne Dukes finished the season with an overall record of 13–17, with a record of 5–11 in the Atlantic 10 regular season in a tie for tenth place. In the 2014 Atlantic 10 tournament, the Dukes were defeated by Richmond in the second round.

Off season

Departures

Incoming Transfers

Incoming recruits

Roster

Schedule

|-
!colspan=9 style="background:#00214D; color:#CC0000;"| Exhibition

|-
!colspan=9 style="background:#00214D; color:#CC0000;"| Non-conference regular season

|-
!colspan=9 style="background:#00214D; color:#CC0000;"| Atlantic 10 regular season

|-
!colspan=9 style="background:#00214D; color:#CC0000;"| Atlantic 10 tournament

See also
2014–15 Duquesne Dukes women's basketball team

References

Duquesne
Duquesne Dukes men's basketball seasons
2014 in sports in Pennsylvania
2015 in sports in Pennsylvania